Illustrissimi, or "To the Illustrious Ones", is a collection of letters written by Pope John Paul I when he was Patriarch of Venice. The letters were originally published in the Italian Christian paper Messaggero di S. Antonio between 1972 and 1975, and published in book form in 1976. The book was first published in English in 1978, when Cardinal Luciani (as he was then known) was elected Pope. As the English translation only reached the public after his death (after reigning as Pope for just 33 days), it stands as one of the few writings in public circulation that indicate what sort of person John Paul I was and what sort of Pope he might have been had he lived longer.

The letters
There are 40 letters in all, mainly to people in Italian history and fiction, but also to internationally well known fictional and historical characters such as Pinocchio, Charles Dickens, Hippocrates and Jesus. Each of the letters tends to be droll and witty, but cleverly turned into a short sermon in order to make a point, whether it is on fashion, pornography, capitalism or the communications industry.

The letters are addressed to the following:

Charles Dickens
Mark Twain
G. K. Chesterton
Maria Theresa of Austria
Charles Péguy
Trilussa
St. Bernard of Clairvaux
Johann Wolfgang von Goethe
King David
Penelope
Figaro
The Pickwick Club
Pinocchio
Paolo Diacono
Gonzalo Fernández de Córdoba
St. Bernardino of Siena
St. Francis de Sales
St. Romedio's Bear
P. I. Chichikov
King Lemuel
Sir Walter Scott
The Unknown Painter at the Castle
Hippocrates
St. Thérèse de Lisieux
Alessandro Manzoni
Casella
Luigi Cornaro
Aldus Manutius
St. Bonaventure
Christopher Marlowe
St. Luke
Quintilian
Guglielmo Marconi
Giuseppe Gioacchino Belli
Félix Dupanloup
Petrarch
St. Theresa of Ávila
Carlo Goldoni
Andreas Hofer
Jesus Christ

The book was last reissued in 2001.

External links
 Ioannes Paulus PP.I - Papa Luciani 
 Web site about St. Therese of Lisieux, to whom Pope John Paul I wrote 

Pope John Paul I
Works originally published in Italian newspapers
Collections of letters
1976 books